New Liberty may refer to:

In the United States:
New Liberty, Illinois
New Liberty, Indiana
New Liberty, Iowa
New Liberty, Kentucky
New Liberty, Missouri